Sergio González Hernández (born 3 December 1955) is a Mexican politician from the National Action Party. From 2009 to 2012 he served as Deputy of the LXI Legislature of the Mexican Congress representing Tlaxcala.

References

1955 births
Living people
Politicians from Tlaxcala
National Action Party (Mexico) politicians
21st-century Mexican politicians
Instituto Politécnico Nacional alumni
Members of the Congress of Tlaxcala
Deputies of the LXI Legislature of Mexico
Members of the Chamber of Deputies (Mexico) for Tlaxcala